Greenhall's dog-faced bat (Cynomops greenhalli) is a South American bat species of the family Molossidae. It is found in Colombia, Peru, Ecuador, Venezuela, the Guianas, northeastern Brazil and Trinidad.

It is an insect-eating bat, 40–97 mm in length. Yellowish brown to black above, grey underneath, it is broad-faced with widely separated eyes. Its ears are short and rounded; the antitragus is square; its lips are not wrinkled; it has a broad snout. Mostly it is found at low elevations. Colonies of 50–77 roost in hollow branches of large trees. Males and females stay together throughout the year. The species is named after Arthur Greenhall, a scientist who was in charge of the rabies program at the Trinidad Regional Virus Laboratory in Port of Spain, Trinidad.

References

Sources
Greenhall, Arthur M. 1961. Bats in Agriculture. A Ministry of Agriculture Publication. Trinidad and Tobago.
LaVal, Richard. "Records of Bats from Honduras and El Salvador." Journal of Mammalogy, Vol. 50, No. 4 (November, 1969), pp. 819–822.
Linares, Omar J. and Pablo Kiblisky. "The Karyotype and a New Record of Molossops greenhalli from Venezuela." Journal of Mammalogy, Vol. 50, No. 4 (November, 1969), pp. 831–832.
 Carter, Gerald G. "A Field key to the Bats of Trinidad." August 2000. Accessed at: https://web.archive.org/web/20070509074216/http://publish.uwo.ca/~gcarter2/Trinidad_batkey_small.pdf.

Cynomops
Mammals described in 1958
Bats of South America
Mammals of Colombia